Ronen Elimelech Altman Kaydar (born October 1, 1972) is an Israeli writer and poet.

The topics of his academic and artistic writing include science fiction, sexual identity, philosophy of science, history of science and more. After his marriage in 2003, he had added the surname "Kaydar".

Biography
Altman Kaydar was born in Tel Aviv to parents who practice science and in 1993 completed his bachelor's degree in Mathematics and Physics in Tel Aviv University's excellence program in the academic reserve. After his release from the Israel Defense Forces, he has studied for a master's degree in the Cohen institute for history and philosophy of the sciences and ideas in Tel Aviv University. His Master's thesis applied models for the spread of science on the case of Israeli genetics.

Literary work
Altman Kaydar is a graduate of the Helicon poetry class of 1997, where his poems were first published. In 2000, his first novel Chaos Butterflies was published by Shufra. The novel combines several plot lines regarding sexual identities in an American city in the end of the 20th century. Since then, Altman Kaydar has published many poems in poetry journals. His poems have been translated to English and Russian, and two of them have been set to music by the Israeli composer Avner Dorman and were performed in a music festival in Görlitz, Germany. Altman Kaydar's first poetry book, Bite Marks (Helicon) was published in August 2007. In addition, he has published poetry translations in various journals and websites.

Since April 2009, Altman Kaydar also edits the web-based literary journal 'Zuta', together with poet Anat Avissar. In 2009 he published the first translation into Hebrew from Mascha Kaleko's works (seven poems in Helicon, an Israeli journal of poetry) and then edited his first poetry volume - Inbal Cahansky's The Wilds of Day - which was published in 2010. In addition, he translated from Hebrew to English the graphic novel 'Farm 54', by Galit seliktar and Gilad Seliktar, which was published by Fanfare in 2011.

Other work
Altman Kaydar is also the co-writer of a script for the student film Make-up, produced in Temple University, directed by Inbar Gilboa and starring Lucy Dubinchik.

References

External links
 Ronen Altman Kaydar in the New Lexicon of Hebrew Literature 
 
  Two poems.
 Ronen Altman Kaydar's Blog 

Israeli poets
Living people
1972 births
Israeli literary critics
Hebrew-language poets
Tel Aviv University alumni